This is a timeline of geopolitical changes around the world prior to 1500. It includes dates of declarations of independence, changes in country name, changes of capital city or name, and changes in territorial ownership such as the annexation, occupation, cession, concession, or secession of land. Territorial conquests as a result of war are included on the timeline at the conclusion of major military campaigns, but changes in the course of specific battles and day-to-day operations are generally not included.

Before the Common Era (BCE)

Fourth Millennium BCE

Third Millennium BCE

Second Millennium BCE

First Millennium BCE

Common Era (CE)

First Millennium CE

1st century

2nd century

3rd century

4th century

5th century

6th century

7th century

8th century

9th century

10th century

Second Millennium CE

11th century

12th century

13th century

14th century

15th century

Maps

See also

References

Bibliography
  

Geography-related lists
Geopolitics
History-related lists
Maps